Pablo National Wildlife Refuge is a National Wildlife Refuge of the United States located in northwestern Montana. It is a unit of the National Bison Range Complex of refuges.

Description

The refuge is nesting habitat for numerous bird species such as the green-winged teal, Canada goose, bittern, and great blue heron. At least one pair of nesting bald eagles produce offspring each year. in 1996, 19 trumpeter swans were released in an effort to establish a breeding flock in the region which appears to have been a success. Small mammals commonly found include muskrat, porcupine, badger and  skunk. The reservoir contains yellow perch and largemouth bass.

The refuge is located immediately west of U.S. Highway 93. It is not permanently staffed and has no improvements. It is managed as an easement and the federal jurisdiction pertains solely to species and habitat protection.

This refuge is managed from the headquarters of the National Bison Range.

See also

References

External links
 Pablo National Wildlife Refuge

National Bison Range Complex
National Wildlife Refuges in Montana
Protected areas of Lake County, Montana
Protected areas established in 1921
1921 establishments in Montana